Pine Run  (sometimes called Pine Run Creek) is a stream in Stone County, Missouri. It is a tributary of the James River which it joins on the northeast side of Galena. The headwaters are located west of Elsey. Missouri routes 13, 265 and the Missouri Pacific Railroad line follow the Pine Run valley between Elsey and Galena.

Pine Run was so named on account of pine timber near its course.

See also
List of rivers of Missouri

References

Rivers of Stone County, Missouri
Rivers of Missouri